Detroit Artists Market (DAM) is the oldest continuously running non profit gallery in the Midwest. The DAM is a contemporary art gallery in Detroit, Michigan located in the cultural Midtown neighborhood near the Detroit Institute of Arts and Wayne State University.

The DAM was created in 1932 and was originally known as the Detroit Young Artists Market.  Its mandate was to give exhibition opportunities to artists under thirty, but by 1936, the gallery was renamed to the Detroit Artists Market, favoring emerging and established Detroit artists.

See also
 Detroit Institute of Arts
 Scarab Club
 Museum of Contemporary Art Detroit

References

Sources
 Rebecca, Massei, Board Games High Hopes and Confusion Behind the Scenes at Detroit Artists Market, Metro Times, 24 August 2005
 Begin, Sherri, Painting a Greener Picture; Detroit Artists Market hopes new director, marketing plan boosts bottom line, Crain's Detroit Business 16 April 2007

Art museums and galleries in Michigan
Art galleries established in 1932
1932 establishments in Michigan